Ninger may refer to:

Emanuel Ninger, counterfeiter in the late 1880s.
Ning'er Hani and Yi Autonomous County, in Yunnan, China